Jake Brian Tench (born 14 September 1992), known professionally as THRDL!FE (pronounced "third life'), is a British record producer, DJ, and songwriter. He is known for his singles "Hear Me Tonight" with Alok, "Wrong Move" with R3HAB & Olivia Holt, "For Love" with Mario and Kelli-Leigh among others. He has also written, produced and remixed records for numerous other notable artists including Marshmello, Jess Glynne, Twice, and more.

Discography

References 

British record producers
British DJs
English people of Trinidad and Tobago descent
British house musicians
British dance musicians
Electronic dance music DJs
1992 births
Living people